WAMW (1580 AM) is a radio station broadcasting a country music format known as "the General 95.9 & 1580". It is licensed to Washington, Indiana, United States.  The station is currently owned by Dewayne Shake, through licensee Shake Broadcasting, LLC. For many years, WAMW was owned by Greene Electronics, but DLC Media operated the station under a local marketing agreement from late 1999 until mid-2020.  The station featured programming from ABC Radio/Citadel Media's Timeless satellite feed.

1580 AM is a Canadian clear-channel frequency.

References

External links

AMW (AM)